Jayanna Films is an Indian film production and distribution company that works in Kannada cinema.

History 

Jayanna Films was founded by Jayanna in 1995. Jayanna was an engineering student at R.V. College of Engineering, Bangalore. In 1994 his father suddenly expired. At his last stages Jayanna 's father handed over him to his uncle KV Keshava Murthy to take care. KV Keshava Murthy was an managing partner in Abhimaan movie theatre Bangalore. Jayanna joined him as a booking clerk. He was too shy to ask his uncle for Rs 2,500 which was required for his college fee. Jayanna had managed a merit seat, but gave up in the third year. He continued working in the Abhiman theatre till it was sold. Jayanna then opened a film distribution office near Madappa Mess, Gandhi Nagar, Bangalore in a 10x10 ft office and began distributing Hindi films on second runs and 'after-city' releases. Bhogendra who owned the Maruti tent cinema on Magadi Road, Bangalore met Jayanna as a business acquaintance when Jayanna was distributing Hindi films on second runs to him. They decided to distribute Kannada films together. That is how they started. They started with the film Police Dog and distributed films like Marma, Devaru Varavanu Kotre, Devarane, Dhruva, Hrudayavantha etc. All of them failed to return their investment. Jayanna and Bhogendra togetherly opened new office on 15 August 2003. Chandra Chakori and Daasa became their first hits as distributors. Then they started to regularly distribute Darshan 's films such as Ayya, Bhoopati, Shastri, Suntaragaali and the list went on. They made money in some and lost in some. Snehana Preethina and Parodi were losses. Jayanna and Bhogendra then distributed Jothe Jotheyali, Mungaru Male, Duniya which were silver jubilee hits. Pallakki and Gaja ran for 100 days. Then they went on to distribute 150 films. 75 per cent of them became hits.

Production
Jayanna and Bhogendra started regular production of films with 2008 film Arjun starring Darshan and Meera Chopra. In 2011 they produced Johny Mera Naam Preethi Mera Kaam starring Duniya Vijay, Ramya and Paramathma starring Puneeth Rajkumar, Deepa Sannidhi, Aindrita Ray. In 2012 they produced Jaanu starring Yash, Deepa Sannidhi and Drama starring Yash, Radhika Pandit, Sathish Ninasam, Sindhu Lokanath. In 2013 they produced Googly starring Yash, Kriti Kharbanda. Only after Googly they started seeing real money.

Filmography

References

https://m.timesofindia.com/entertainment/kannada/movies/news/The-men-behind-Rana-Vikrama-Mungaru-Male/articleshow/46902872.cms

External links
 
 

1995 establishments in Karnataka
Indian film studios
Film production companies based in Bangalore